The Canton of La Plaine d'Illibéris is a French canton of Pyrénées-Orientales department, in Occitanie. At the French canton reorganisation which came into effect in March 2015, the canton of La Plaine d'Illibéris was created including 5 communes from the canton of Elne and 2 from the canton of La Côte Radieuse.

Composition 
Alénya 
Bages
Corneilla-del-Vercol
Elne 
Latour-Bas-Elne 
Montescot
Ortaffa
Théza
Villeneuve-de-la-Raho

References

Plaine d'Illiberis